Anugerah Bintang Popular Berita Harian (literally: "Popular Star Award"), commonly known by the acronym ABPBH, originally named as Anugerah Pelakon/Penyanyi Popular - Nescafe Classic, is an award presented annually by Berita Harian of Malaysia to recognise and honour the popularity of Malaysian celebrities and entertainers in the entertainment industry, including the film industry, television industry as well as music industry. The award ceremony features performances by prominent artists. It is the most prestigious people's choice award for Malaysian artists in the entertainment industry.

The award was established in 1987 and it is totally based from the votes submitted by the readers of Berita Harian. The first Anugerah Bintang Popular telecast took place on the night of 1 December 1987 in Dewan Bunga Raya, Putra World Trade Centre. There were only seven categories presented in the first award ceremony.

In 1989, Radio Televisyen Malaysia in collaboration with SALEM made Anugerah Bintang Popular available for live broadcasting. The award took place in Angkasapuri on 13 January 1990. On that very night, a new category of Most Popular Artiste was introduced, which is still maintained until now.

Nomination process
The recording labels, TV stations, radio stations, and film production companies are responsible to hand over a name list of artists that are eligible to compete in each category. The nominees could be personnels, celebrities, actors, and singers that are active and consistent in their own field in a certain period of time.

For each radio network or station, nomination is limited to three male and female radio presenters. The radio station must be aired at least in three states. For TV host, nominations are eligible for those who are the steady host for a certain programme, at least for two seasons since its broadcast.

Nomination for actors and actresses are based from films that have passed the evaluation of Lembaga Penapisan Filem (LPF). Each film could nominate two actors and actresses for the category of Most Popular Movie Actor and Most Popular Movie Actress, apart from the category of Best New Male Artist and Best New Female Artist. On the other hand, terms and conditions for each category of Most Popular Male Singer, Most Popular Female Singer, and Most Popular Group is guided by the terms applied in Anugerah Industri Muzik.

The early nomination would be published in Berita Harian, usually for five consecutive weeks. In that period of time, the readers will select the best five nominees for each category that are available. Once the five nominees are finalised, the second round of voting session would be made available to all readers in which they have to select only one winner for each category. The result would be announced in the prestigious ceremony every year.

Categories
The Anugerah Bintang Popular award are awarded in a series of categories, each of which isolate a specific contribution to acting and singing. The standard awards list nominees in each category from which a winner is selected. Some categories have been added and removed over time. The following is a list of the currently awarded categories:

Main Awards
 Most Popular Star
 Lifetime Achievement Award
 Popular Versatile Artist
 Popular Film Actor
 Popular Film Actress
 Popular TV Actor
 Popular TV Actress
 Popular Male Singer
 Popular Female Singer
 Popular Collaboration/Duo/Group
 Popular Comedy Artist
 Popular TV Host
 Popular Radio Presenter
 Popular Male New Artist
 Popular Female New Artist

Special Awards
 Popular Sensational Artist
 Favourite On-screen Couple (Drama)
 Favourite On-screen Couple (Film)
 Popular Social Media Personality
 Popular Instafamous

Most Popular Star winners

Lifetime Achievement Award recipients

See also
 2008 Anugerah Bintang Popular
 2009 Anugerah Bintang Popular

Footnotes

References

External links
 

Malaysian film awards
Awards established in 1987
Television awards
Television in Malaysia